Miguel García (6 July 1945 – 11 May 2009) was an Argentine boxer. He competed in the men's featherweight event at the 1968 Summer Olympics.

References

1945 births
2009 deaths
Argentine male boxers
Olympic boxers of Argentina
Boxers at the 1968 Summer Olympics
Boxers at the 1967 Pan American Games
Pan American Games gold medalists for Argentina
Pan American Games medalists in boxing
Sportspeople from Mendoza, Argentina
Featherweight boxers
Medalists at the 1967 Pan American Games